Per-Edward "Bam" Carlson is a Swedish former professional Grand Prix motorcycle road racer. His best year was in 1978, when he finished eighth in the 125cc world championship.

References 

Year of birth missing (living people)
Living people
Swedish motorcycle racers
125cc World Championship riders